Pseudotelphusa acrobrunella is a moth of the family Gelechiidae. It is found in Korea, Japan and the Russian Far East.

The wingspan is 11–13 mm. The forewings are yellowish brown with three pairs of distinct dots of raised scale tufts and three dark greyish fascia along the costa. The hindwings are grey. Adults are on wing from early May to early August, probably in two generations per year in Korea.

The larvae feed on the leaves of Quercus species.

References

Moths described in 1992
Pseudotelphusa